The 2017 CAF Champions League qualifying rounds were played from 10 February to 19 March 2017. A total of 55 teams competed in the qualifying rounds to decide the 16 places in the group stage of the 2017 CAF Champions League.

Draw

The draw for the preliminary round and first round was held on 21 December 2016 at the CAF headquarters in Cairo, Egypt.

The entry round of the 55 teams entered into the draw was determined by their performances in the CAF competitions for the previous five seasons (CAF 5-Year Ranking points shown in parentheses).

Format

In the qualifying rounds, each tie was played on a home-and-away two-legged basis. If the aggregate score was tied after the second leg, the away goals rule would be applied, and if still tied, extra time would not be played, and the penalty shoot-out would be used to determine the winner (Regulations III. 13 & 14).

Schedule
The schedule of each round was as follows.

Bracket
The bracket of the draw was announced by the CAF on 21 December 2016.

The 16 winners of the first round advanced to the group stage, while the 16 losers of the first round entered the Confederation Cup play-off round.

Preliminary round
The preliminary round included the 46 teams that did not receive byes to the first round.

|}

Rail Club du Kadiogo won 3–1 on aggregate.

Al-Merrikh won 5–1 on aggregate.

Rivers United won 4–0 on aggregate.

AS Tanda won 4–3 on aggregate.

Horoya won 2–1 on aggregate.

FUS Rabat won 4–1 on aggregate.

Al-Ahli Tripoli won 5–1 on aggregate.

2–2 on aggregate. KCCA won on away goals.

CF Mounana won 3–0 on aggregate.

Zanaco won 1–0 on aggregate

Young Africans won 6–2 on aggregate.

1–1 on aggregate. Barrack Young Controllers won 7–6 on penalties.

Ferroviário Beira won 4–3 on aggregate.

1–1 on aggregate. Enugu Rangers won on away goals.

AS Vita Club won 4–1 on aggregate.

Gambia Ports Authority won 1–0 on aggregate.

4–4 on aggregate. CNaPS Sport won on away goals.

Coton Sport won 7–2 on aggregate.

Bidvets Wits won 4–3 on aggregate.

CAPS United won 2–1 on aggregate.

Saint George won 5–0 on aggregate.

2–2 on aggregate. AC Léopards won on away goals.

AS Port-Louis 2000 won 3–2 on aggregate.

First round
The first round included 32 teams: the 23 winners of the preliminary round, and the 9 teams that received byes to this round.

|}

USM Alger won 2–1 on aggregate.

Al-Merrikh won 4–3 on aggregate.

Étoile du Sahel won 5–1 on aggregate.

Espérance de Tunis won 4–3 on aggregate.

3–3 on aggregate. Al-Ahli Tripoli won on away goals.

Mamelodi Sundowns won 3–2 on aggregate.

1–1 on aggregate. Wydad AC won 5–4 on penalties.

1–1 on aggregate. Zanaco won on away goals.

2–2 on aggregate. Ferroviário Beira won 4–1 on penalties.

Zamalek won 5–3 on aggregate.

AS Vita Club won 3–1 on aggregate.

Coton Sport won 2–1 on aggregate.

Al Ahly won 1–0 on aggregate.

1–1 on aggregate. CAPS United won on away goals.

Saint George won 3–0 on aggregate.

Al-Hilal won 5–2 on aggregate.

Notes

References

External links
Total Champions League 2017, CAFonline.com

1
February 2017 sports events in Africa
March 2017 sports events in Africa